FK Bratstvo Lisičani is a football club based in the village of Lisičani near Kičevo, North Macedonia. They currently playing in the OFS Gostivar league.

History
The club was founded in 1982.

References

External links
Bratstvo Lisičani Facebook 
Club info at MacedonianFootball 
Football Federation of Macedonia 

Bratstvo Lisičani
Association football clubs established in 1982
1982 establishments in the Socialist Republic of Macedonia
Kičevo Municipality